Małgorzata Jamroży (born 30 June 1991), known professionally as Margaret, is a Polish singer and songwriter. She rose to prominence in her native country in 2013, and achieved moderate chart success in some European territories with her singles "Thank You Very Much" (2013) and "Cool Me Down" (2016). After signing an international record deal with Warner Music in 2016, she became particularly successful in Sweden, and participated in the country's music competition Melodifestivalen in two consecutive years with the songs "In My Cabana" and "Tempo" in 2018 and 2019, respectively.

Before her mainstream debut, Margaret performed with underground bands, recorded soundtracks for television commercials and films, and produced a fashion blog. Through her blogging, she was discovered by a talent agent who helped her secure a record deal with the label Extensive Music. She released her first extended play (EP) All I Need in 2013, which was later incorporated into her debut studio album Add the Blonde (2014). The latter reached the top 10 in the Polish charts, and spawned the singles "Wasted", "Start a Fire" and "Heartbeat". In 2015, she recorded a collaborative jazz album with Matt Dusk titled Just the Two of Us. Margaret attained her second Polish top 10 record with her third studio album Monkey Business (2017), which yielded the singles "What You Do" and "Byle jak". Seeking more control over artistic creativity, she left her record label and management in 2019, and released her first Polish-language album, Gaja Hornby, which saw her depart mainstream pop music for a more urban sound. Margaret continued the reinvention on her fifth studio album, Maggie Vision (2021), which became her highest-charting album to date.

Margaret has received numerous accolades, including five Eska Music Awards, a Kids' Choice Award and four MTV Europe Music Awards for Best Polish Act—more than any other artist in this category. She was included on a 2014 list of the 100 most-valuable stars of Polish show business compiled by the Polish edition of Forbes. In 2015, the Polish magazine Wprost named her one of the 50 most-influential Polish celebrities. Alongside her music career, Margaret has endorsed numerous products, designed a clothing line for fashion retailer Sinsay in 2015 and voiced Smurfstorm in the Polish-language version of Smurfs: The Lost Village in 2017. She also served as a coach on The Voice of Poland in 2019, and made her acting debut in the 2022 film Zadra.

Early life and education
Małgorzata Jamroży was born on 30 June 1991 in Stargard Szczeciński, Poland, to teachers Ryszard and Elżbieta Jamroży. She has an older brother named Tomasz, four years her senior and a chemist, with whom she grew up in Ińsko. Jamroży was raised Catholic. Upon being confirmed, she took Julita as her confirmation name.

As a child, Jamroży participated in many singing contests. She attended the Ińsko school complex—a primary school and gymnasium— and initially studied clarinet before changing to saxophone at the Ignacy Jan Paderewski first degree State Music School in Choszczno. Shortly after finishing music school, her nasal septum was damaged in a bicycle accident; this temporarily prevented her from playing an instrument. At age 16, she moved to Szczecin, where she graduated from high school. She also started taking private singing lessons from jazz teacher of Katowice Academy of Music Justyna Motylska, and from vocal coach Elżbieta Zapendowska. At this time, she adopted the stage name Margaret, the English-language equivalent of Małgorzata.

At 18, Margaret moved to Warsaw. She began an English studies degree at the University of Social Sciences and Humanities but left after three semesters. In 2015, she graduated from the Warsaw International School of Costume and Fashion Design majoring in fashion design.

Career

2006–2012: Career beginnings
In 2006, Margaret appeared on the Polish television talent show Szansa na Sukces ("A Chance for Success") singing Stenia Kozłowska's song "Będę czekać" ("I'll Be Waiting"). She returned to the programme in 2009 and won an episode by performing Monika Brodka's song "Znam Cię na pamięć" ("I Know You by Heart"). She took part in the show's 2009 final at the Congress Hall in Warsaw. In high school, she performed in a rock band called Walizka ("Suitcase"), and in the band oNieboLepiej ("Much Better"), with whom she sang poetry.

In 2010, Margaret appeared in the musical Rent at the Szczecin Opera in the Castle. That year, she co-founded Margaret J. Project, a six-piece electropop band with R&B and hip hop influences that she formed with music producer and bassist Adam Kabaciński. They qualified for the semi-finals of the 2010 Coke Live Fresh Noise competition. The group disbanded in November 2012; their studio album This Is Margaret was released online in 2013. In 2011, Margaret produced a fashion blog that incorporated videos of her singing. Her blogging activity waned as her music career progressed. Early in her career, Margaret also recorded soundtracks for Polish television commercials and films, including "Moments" and "It Will Be Lovely Day". The latter was released for digital download in July 2012 under Margaret's birth name, and received radio airplay. According to Polish music manager Maja Sablewska, Margaret was not well-known but her voice was "ubiquitous".

2012–2013: Breakthrough with "Thank You Very Much"; All I Need
While Margaret was blogging, she was approached by her future manager Sławomir Berdowski, who became interested in working with her after hearing her recording of Adele's song "Right as Rain". Berdowski arranged for Margaret to work with music producers Thomas Karlsson, Joakim Buddee and Ant Whiting, who wrote her debut single "Thank You Very Much". Shortly after recording the song, Margaret was signed by the Swedish record label Extensive Music. The label signed a licensing deal with Universal Music Poland's Magic Records, which released Margaret's music in Poland. In May 2012, Margaret debuted "Thank You Very Much" at the 2012 TOPtrendy Festival at Sopot's Forest Opera amphitheatre, and the song was released to Polish contemporary hit radio. Shortly thereafter, Margaret's management decided to withdraw the song from radio stations and designed a promotional plan before re-releasing it.

"Thank You Very Much" and its music video were released for digital download in February 2013 and immediately sold well in Poland. The song won an award as the third-best-selling digital single of 2013 in Poland by a Polish artist. Margaret worked with director Chris Piliero on the song's music video, in which she is surrounded by 30 nude extras. The video was removed by YouTube for violating the website's policy against nudity and sexual content; it was later restored with age restrictions. Following this, Margaret expressed her support of the right to nudity under the slogan "Liberty, Equality, Fraternity" and criticised YouTube for censorship. The video received substantial media coverage, contributing to the international success of "Thank You Very Much". A year after its release, the music video appeared on the website 9GAG, increasing its YouTube traffic to more than 500,000 views in 24 hours. In June 2013, Margaret travelled to Germany to promote "Thank You Very Much" with a live performance on ZDF Fernsehgarten ("ZDF Television Garden"). After her appearance on the show, the single peaked at number 38 in Austria and at number 41 in Germany.

Margaret's second single "Tell Me How Are Ya" was released in July 2013 on her first extended play (EP) All I Need, which reached number 50 on the Polish albums chart. She represented Poland at the July 2013 Baltic Song Contest in Sweden, in which she sang "Thank You Very Much" and an EP cut "I Get Along", and finished second out of ten competitors. Margaret was nominated in several categories at the 2013 Eska Music Awards, including Best Female Artist, Best Debut, Best Hit and Best Music Video (both for "Thank You Very Much"), and won the lattermost. She was also nominated for Best Polish Act at the 2013 MTV Europe Music Awards. In December 2013, Margaret embarked on a promotional tour of Italy, where "Thank You Very Much" peaked at number 22 on the official singles chart.

2014–2016: Add the Blonde, Just the Two of Us and "Cool Me Down"

In January 2014, Margaret released "Wasted" as the lead single from her first studio album Add the Blonde. The song reached number six in Poland. In February, she became a spokesperson for Play, a Polish telecoms provider. Add the Blonde was released in August 2014, containing all songs from Margaret's 2013 EP All I Need and eight new tracks. It is a pop record that was influenced by retro-disco and ska, and by the work of Madonna. The album reached number eight in Poland and was certified platinum by the Polish Society of the Phonographic Industry (ZPAV). The same month, Margaret released "Start a Fire", which was the official song of the 2014 FIVB Volleyball Men's World Championship in Poland. She performed it at the tournament's opening ceremony. The song also became the second single from Add the Blonde and peaked at number 10 in Poland. Around this time, she recorded a cover of Katarzyna Sobczyk's song "O mnie się nie martw" ("Don't You Worry About Me"), which was used as the theme song of the Polish television series of the same name. Margaret was featured on a 2014 Christmas charity album called Siemacha po kolędzie ("Siemacha After Carolling"), which was recorded in support of the Siemacha Association; its follow-up Gwiazdy po kolędzie ("Stars After Carolling") includes two songs recorded by Margaret and was released in 2015. The third single from Add the Blonde, "Heartbeat", was released in February 2015 and charted at number 11 in Poland.

In August 2015, Margaret won two Eska Music Awards for Best Female Artist and Best Artist on the Internet. She became the co-host of the musical television show Retromania, which began airing on TVP1 that September. The show was cancelled after two months. Also in September, a clothing line Margaret designed for fashion retailer Sinsay was released under the name "Margaret for Sinsay". At the 2015 MTV Europe Music Awards, she won the award for Best Polish Act and was nominated for Best European Act. In November that year, she released her second studio album Just the Two of Us, a collaboration with Canadian jazz singer Matt Dusk. The album consists of interpretations of jazz standards. To prepare for its recording, Margaret listened to recordings by Ella Fitzgerald, whom she has cited as an influence. Margaret said she made a jazz record to fulfil her dream and that she has no plans to give up her pop career. Just the Two of Us was promoted with two singles, the title track and "'Deed I Do". The album reached number 28 in Poland and received a platinum certification from ZPAV. Margaret also appeared in two Polish Coca-Cola advertising campaigns that year, performing covers of two songs. One of them, the Polish-language version of the Christmas song "Wonderful Dream (Holidays Are Coming)" titled "Coraz bliżej święta", reached number 32 in Poland in 2015 and has re-entered the Polish charts each holiday season since, peaking at number 29 in 2021. She was also featured in Deichmann's Autumn/Winter 2015 Polish advertising campaign and by March 2018 had appeared in five more commercials.

In February 2016, Polish broadcaster Telewizja Polska (TVP) announced that Margaret would compete in Krajowe Eliminacje 2016 ("National Eliminations 2016"), Poland's national final for the Eurovision Song Contest 2016, with the song "Cool Me Down". Margaret quickly became bookmakers' and Eurovision fans' favourite to win both the national final and the Eurovision Song Contest, but in the final of Krajowe Eliminacje in March she finished in second place. The song subsequently won the OGAE Second Chance Contest 2016. Margaret later said: "That was a lot of pressure and it was a big lesson for me. I don't feel that music and artists should be ranked in any way. It's not like in sport. Someone will get to the end faster, or jump higher. You can't compare music. You just like it or not." Ellie Chalkley of ESC Insight analysed the song's impact on the Eurovision Song Contest in 2017; she described it as "real, tangible, and long lasting" and wrote that "even without getting to the competition proper, 'Cool Me Down' might turn out to be one of the most influential Eurovision songs in recent years". She added that "it exists at a pop-cultural tipping point and the ways in which Margaret's stomper succeeded and failed could affect the sound of the contest for years to come".

"Cool Me Down" reached number four in Poland, becoming Margaret's first Polish top-five single, and was certified two-times platinum by ZPAV. In March 2016, Margaret won the Kids' Choice Award for Favourite Polish Star. The following month, she signed an international record deal with Warner Music Group and released "Cool Me Down" in various territories. The single achieved moderate chart success in Sweden, peaking at number 36, and received a gold certification from the Swedish Recording Industry Association (GLF). Its success in the country allowed Margaret to tour Sweden; she played shows during July and August 2016, including televised performances on Sommarkrysset ("Summercross"), Lotta på Liseberg ("Lotta at Liseberg") and at Rockbjörnen ("The Rock Bear") awards ceremony. At the 2016 Eska Music Awards, Margaret premiered "Elephant" and won her second consecutive award for Best Artist on the Internet. "Elephant" was released as a single on 27 August and charted at number 21 in Poland. Margaret won her second consecutive MTV Europe Music Award for Best Polish Act in November. Both "Cool Me Down" and "Elephant" were included on the December 2016 reissue of Add the Blonde.

2017–2019: Monkey Business and Melodifestivalen

While working on her third studio album Monkey Business, Margaret voiced Smurfstorm in the Polish-language version of the 2017 animated feature film Smurfs: The Lost Village. To promote the film, she released the song "Blue Vibes" in March 2017. The following month, she signed an advertising deal with the nail products brand Semilac in Poland. Monkey Business was released in June 2017 and peaked at number eight in Poland. Margaret described the album as "versatile" and said she had more artistic control over its production than with her debut album; she was in charge whereas with Add the Blonde, she received and acted on advice from her producers. Monkey Business was preceded by the single "What You Do", which was released in May and reached number 14 on Poland's singles chart. Margaret's collaboration with the Swedish group VAX, titled "6 in the Morning", was also released in May. She won her third consecutive Eska Music Award for Best Artist on the Internet in June 2017. That September, she received the TVP1 Special Award at the 2017 National Festival of Polish Song. Monkey Businesss second single "Byle jak" ("Anyhow") was released in December 2017, and reached number six in Poland.

In 2018, Margaret became the first Polish artist to compete in Melodifestivalen, a competition to select Sweden's entry for Eurovision Song Contest, with the song "In My Cabana". She said she was invited to take part in the contest by the show's producer Christer Björkman, who spotted her on Swedish television; Björkman later referred to her as "incredibly starlike". With her participation, she intended to promote her music in Sweden and present herself to a broad Swedish audience. She added that in her opinion, a Swedish artist should represent Sweden at Eurovision. Margaret performed in the second semi-final in February 2018 and advanced to the Andra chansen ("Second chance") round. She ultimately qualified for the final, and finished in seventh place with 103 points. "In My Cabana" was released on the day of her semi-final performance; it charted at number three in Poland and at number eight in Sweden.

Following her participation in Melodifestivalen, Margaret appeared in a promotional campaign for new line of a non-alcoholic beer called Warka Radler, which was launched in April 2018. That August, she supported Europride by releasing a single titled "Lollipop", which served as Warner Music Sweden's anthem for the event. Margaret commented on her involvement in the project: "I have always supported love initiatives and love of all kinds. Love is Love." In November, she received her third MTV Europe Music Award for Best Polish Act, becoming the most-awarded artist in this category to date. She returned to Melodifestivalen in February 2019 with the song "Tempo", finished fifth in the second semi-final and was eliminated from the competition. "Tempo" charted in Poland at number seven and in Sweden at number 43. Margaret also made a cameo appearance as Gaja Hornby in the 2019 Polish romantic comedy Całe szczęście ("Their Lucky Stars"), and recorded a song of the same name for its soundtrack.

2019–2021: Independence and genre shift with Gaja Hornby and Maggie Vision

With her fourth studio album, Gaja Hornby, Margaret took a new artistic direction, which she felt had more musical and lyrical depth. The album was her first Polish-language record and she co-wrote every track. A departure from bubblegum pop which Margaret was previously known for, Gaja Hornby incorporated a more urban sound than her earlier work. The album was named after her alter ego. It was released in May 2019 and charted in Poland at number 13. Jarek Szubrycht of Gazeta Wyborcza praised Margaret for making progress as an artist and noted that Polish producers with whom she worked on the record significantly influenced its sound, which differs from that of her previous work, regarding it as a positive change. Gaja Hornby earned Margaret a Fryderyk nomination for Album of the Year – Pop. The album's title track was released as its first single in April 2019, followed by "Serce Baila" ("Heart Dances") in June, "Chwile bez słów" ("Moments Without Words"; featuring Kacezet) in July, and "Ej chłopaku" ("Hey Boy") in September. In July, Margaret collaborated with Polish rapper Young Igi on his single "Układanki" ("Jigsaws"), which has been certified two-times platinum in Poland. She served as a coach on the 10th season of The Voice of Poland from September to November 2019. Her final act, Tadeusz Seibert, came in third place. Margaret embarked on her Gaja Hornby Tour in October 2019. Around this time, she officially split from her record label and management and terminated her international record deal with Warner Music as she decided to take control of her own career.

Margaret announced an indefinite hiatus in December 2019 due to health problems; she later revealed she struggled with depression after her stint on The Voice. In February 2020, with her husband Kacezet, she founded the record label Gaja Hornby Records, which officially launched in November 2021 as a subsidiary of Sony Music Entertainment Poland. Margaret broke her three-month silence in March 2020, announcing a collaboration with cancer charity Rak'n'Roll Foundation. She raised 20,000 zł (€5,000 as of March 2020) through an online fundraiser for the charity, and released the single "Nowe Plemię" ("New Tribe") on 19 March as part of their Rak'n'Roll Music project. With the release of the song, it was announced that she had signed with Sony Music Entertainment Poland. At the 2020 MTV Europe Music Awards, she extended her record as the most-awarded artist in the Best Polish Act category winning for the fourth time.

A combination of hip hop and urban pop, Margaret's fifth studio album, Maggie Vision, was released on 12 February 2021. It received positive reviews from music critics with some calling it her best album to date. The record debuted at number five in the Polish charts. It was promoted with nine singles: "Nowe Plemię", "Przebiśniegi" ("Snowdrops"), "Reksiu" with Otsochodzi, "Roadster" with Kizo, "Fotel" ("Armchair"), "Xanax", "No Future" with Kukon which she released in recognition of the 2020 women's strike protests in Poland, "Antipop" with Kara, and "Sold Out" with Natalia Szroeder. Both "Reksiu" and "Roadster" have been certified gold in Poland, and the former's music video also earned a Fryderyk nomination. On 25 June 2021, Margaret released the single "Tak na oko" from her EP Gelato, which followed on 2 July along with its titular second single featuring Polish rapper Tymek. The foremost peaked at number 18 on Poland's singles chart and has been certified platinum in the country. Margaret embarked on her second headlining concert tour, Maggie Vision Tour, in October 2021. In addition to solo material, in 2021, she appeared on 1988's single "Bajkał" with Kacha, a remix of Rasmentalism's song "Numer" for the deluxe edition of their album Geniusz, RIP Scotty and Leeo's single "CandyFlip", Bartek Deryło's song "Zima" from his debut album Latawce, Urboishawty's single "Kocha", and Team X's Christmas song "Pod choinką".

2022–present: Siniaki i cekiny

In 2022, Margaret released the singles "Cry in My Gucci", "Vino" and "Niespokojne morze" in May, June and August, respectively. The lattermost peaked at number 28 in Poland, and has been certified gold in the country. She also collaborated with Anja Pham on the single "Oversize" in February, with Pedro, Francis and Beteo on their single "Hood Love (a ja nie)" in July, and with Włodi on the cover of Republika's song "Mamona" in September. She wrote two songs for Viki Gabor's 2022 second studio album ID: "Lollipop" and "Cute", which she also featured on.

Margaret begun 2023 by collaborating with Janusz Walczuk on the song "Showbiznes" from his second studio album Jan Walczuk. That March, she joined the supergroup club2020 to appear on five tracks from their eponymous album, before releasing her third EP Urbano Futuro. The former spawned two singles that feature Margaret: "Cypher2022" and "Deszcz", while the latter yielded the singles "Początek" and "VIP" which feature Walczuk and Hanafi, respectively. Margaret recorded a performance for the MTV Unplugged special, which is set to premiere in the spring of 2023. She is also set to serve as the opening act for the Polish date of Pinks Summer Carnival in July 2023. She will release her sixth studio album, Siniaki i cekiny, influenced by the 1980s R&B, at some point in 2023.

Aside from her music endeavours, Margaret starred in the 2022 radio drama series titled Niech to usłyszą produced by Radio ZET, playing a kidnapped singer Maggie. She also made her cinematic debut that year, starring as Justi in the Polish musical film Zadra. The film premiered at the Gdynia Film Festival in September 2022, where it competed in the main competition, and was released theatrically in March 2023. The experience of working on the film inspired her to pursue more acting projects in the future.

Artistry

Margaret is an alto. On the single "Cool Me Down", her vocal range covers around one-and-a-half octaves from G4 to C6. Her vocals were widely compared to Rihanna's, whom some listeners accused Margaret of copying. She responded: "In lower registers my timbre is indeed similar to Rihanna's ... I will not apologise for that". Although Margaret's music has been classified as pop, she incorporates other musical styles into her songs. She said her music is "bitter-sweet. It looks cute and sweet, but it can get serious, wild and crazy."

Margaret has been actively involved in the songwriting process for her albums since the beginning of her career. She co-wrote four of the songs on Add the Blonde, most of the songs on Monkey Business, and beginning with Gaja Hornby, she co-writes all of her songs. The majority of her earlier work is in English, which she attributed partly to the fact that her songs sound better when sung in that language. On her first Polish-language album Gaja Hornby, Margaret said she felt ready to open up and sing in her native language, and compared singing in English to wearing a mask. The album introduced Margaret's alter ego Gaja Hornby, a combination of a name she wished she was given at birth and the name of her favourite author Nick Hornby, which she adopted at the beginning of her career to protect her privacy and regain anonymity. Margaret said the reason to reveal her alter ego was to show her fans the more personal side of her life. The album also marked the beginning of her transition from mainstream pop music to a more urban sound, which was influenced by her husband Kacezet.

Margaret has named the Polish singer Grażyna Łobaszewska as a role model and her biggest inspiration, and credits Polish rapper Łona as a primary influence on her writing style.

Critical reception
Reviewing Add the Blonde, Codzienna Gazeta Muzyczna ("Daily Music Newspaper") called Margaret's voice distinctive, while Onet noted her versatility, writing that she can sing "seductively, and innocently, and romantically". Onet also praised Margaret for writing her own songs, but Codzienna Gazeta Muzyczna called her lyrics "rather simple and undemanding, emotionally as advanced as the average listener of the album". Jazz Forums Daniel Wyszogrodzki in his review of Just the Two of Us wrote that Margaret has potential as a smooth jazz singer due to the "exceptional purity of her voice" and its "interesting timbre". Polish music critic Robert Kozyra, however, described her voice as "small" and added that her "weak" live performances reveal her limited vocal capabilities. Interia and Onet, in their reviews of Monkey Business, criticised Margaret's attempt at singing Polish ballads, saying her "girly" voice is best suited for uptempo songs.

Public image
Margaret's fashion style and music are covered widely by Polish media. Known for experimenting with fashion, she has cited Miroslava Duma, Kate Moss and earlier in her career Gwen Stefani, as her fashion inspirations. She described herself as a fashion victim, but said that experimenting with fashion allowed her to find her own style. Marcin Brzeziński of Viva! magazine expressed his admiration for Margaret's approach to fashion and her lack of limits, while Dorota Wróblewska, a Polish stylist and fashion show producer, noted that Margaret is not afraid of criticism and likes to surprise audiences with her fashion choices. Polish Glamour magazine recognised her as Glamour Woman of the Year in 2014 and Fashion Icon in 2015. In 2020, she ranked 10th on the Polish magazine Wprosts ("Directly") list of the Best Dressed Polish Women.

Margaret was the eighth-most-googled Polish celebrity while "Margaret" was the fourth-most-googled word in the Polish music category in Googles 2013 Zeitgeist report. In 2014, she was included on the list of 100 most valuable stars of Polish show business compiled by the Polish edition of Forbes magazine. Her market value was estimated at 235,000 zł (€57,000 as of July 2014), ranking her 67th on the list. In 2015, Wprost placed her at number 38 on its list of 50 most-influential Polish celebrities. She ranked fifth on Forbes Women Polands 2022 list of 100 most valuable female personal brands with an advertising value equivalency (AVE) of 155 million zł.

Personal life and activism

Margaret met Polish musician Piotr "Kacezet" Kozieradzki in 2017, and confirmed their relationship a year later. In May 2019, she announced their engagement. They married the following January in Peru in a spiritual wedding ceremony performed by shamans. The marriage is not recognised in law. She is a stepmother to his daughter Naomi from his previous relationship.

Margaret openly talks about her struggles with mental health. She has been going to therapy since the beginning of her career to cope with fame, and believes that looking after one's mental health should be normalised having compared it to going to the gym. In 2022, she revealed she had been raped at age 10, and later attempted suicide due to the incident, shortly before the release of her debut single. She said that years of repressed emotions caused by the event pushed her to her breaking point in 2019, which resulted in her career break.

Margaret endorses environmentalism, and named her alter ego after the Greek Mother Earth Gaia. She actively supports the LGBT community, and Anja Rubik's "SexEd" campaign, which promotes sex education. In a 2019 interview with Playboy Poland magazine, she criticised the Catholic church for its sexual ethics and said she wants to commit apostasy. She later explained she does not believe in God and said it only feels right to leave the group she no longer feels part of. In a 2021 interview, Margaret further clarified that she does not believe in the Christian God, but she does not consider herself an atheist. She said she is a spiritual person, and believes in energy.

In June 2020, Margaret organised an Instagram Stories takeover series called "Tęczowa Szkoła Maggie" ("Maggie's Rainbow School") to celebrate Pride Month. A response to the President of Poland Andrzej Duda's comment about LGBT being an "ideology", the series saw Margaret hand over her Instagram account to members of the LGBT community who shared their daily lives with her followers in an attempt to break social stigma against the LGBT people. She returned with the series in 2021 and 2022. Margaret supports the idea of sisterhood rather than feminism, and in 2021, she became an ambassador of the "#NieCzekam107Lat" ("I'm Not Waiting 107 Years") campaign, which highlights the issue of gender gap in Poland, which is expected to close in 107 years. Margaret released the charity song "Mimo burz" in March 2022 to benefit Ukraine during the 2022 Russian invasion. She also offered to accommodate in her apartment Ukrainian refugees, and was one of many Polish artists who collectively made financial donations to the Polish Center for International Aid, which supports those affected during the war, raising 936,000 zł.

Achievements

Margaret has won various accolades during her career, including five Eska Music Awards, a Kids' Choice Award and four MTV Europe Music Awards. Her third MTV Europe Music Award win in 2018 made her the only Polish artist to win the award more than twice, a record she extended in 2020 with her fourth win. She has also received a SuperJedynka award in 2014 and the TVP1 Special Award at the National Festival of Polish Song in 2017.

Margaret was the third most-streamed Polish female artist of the decade on Spotify in a ranking published by Spotify Poland for its tenth anniversary in 2023.

Discography

 Add the Blonde (2014)
 Just the Two of Us (2015)
 Monkey Business (2017)
 Gaja Hornby (2019)
 Maggie Vision (2021)
 Siniaki i cekiny (2023)

References

External links 

 
1991 births
21st-century Polish women singers
English-language singers from Poland
Extensive Music artists
Living people
Melodifestivalen contestants of 2018
Melodifestivalen contestants of 2019
MTV Europe Music Award winners
People from Stargard
Polish hip hop singers
Polish pop singers
Polish women singer-songwriters
Sony Music artists